Elizabeth Taylor (1932–2011) was a British-American actress.

Elizabeth Taylor or Liz Taylor may also refer to:

 Elizabeth Taylor (novelist) (1912–1975), English novelist and short story writer
 Elizabeth Taylor (painter) (1856–1932), American artist, journalist, and botanist
 Elizabeth Taylor (social reformer) (1868–1941), New Zealand temperance worker, community leader and social reformer
 Frances Taylor Davis (1929–2018), American dancer and actress who was credited on Broadway as Elizabeth Taylor
 Liz Taylor (American Horror Story), an American Horror Story: Hotel character
 Liz Taylor (Hollyoaks) or Liz Burton, a character on Hollyoaks
 "Elizabeth Taylor", a song by Pete Yorn from the album Hawaii

See also
 Betty Taylor (disambiguation)
 Eliza Taylor (born 1989), Australian actress
 Lizz Tayler (born 1990), American pornographic actress